Stobaugh is a surname. Notable people with the surname include:

 Fred Stobaugh (1917–2016), oldest artist to appear on Hot 100
 Robert B. Stobaugh (1927–2017), American educator